The One-T ODC is the debut studio album from French electronic music project "One-T & Cool-T". Its genre is mainly electro-club, but it also targets more commercial genres closely relating to pop music and electrodance.

Track listing
"Overture" – 0:40
"Music Is the One-T ODC (Episode One)" – 3:59
"One-T's Army" – 4:45
"Bein' a Star (Episode Two)" – 3:27
"Acidlab" – 5:25
"The Magic Key (Episode Three)" – 5:14
"Cool-T's Paradise" – 4:16
"Interlude" – 0:48
"The Travoltino Theme (I See a House)" – 5:21
"The Travoltino Club (One-T's Gonna Shine)" – 5:17
"What's the Deal With Nine-T?" – 4:38
"ODC by Acidman" (not listed on back sleeve) - 5:01 
"Interlude" – 0:27
"Each Day Is Gettin' Crazier Than the Last" – 6:32

References

2003 debut albums
One-T albums